Fran Pilepić (born May 5, 1989) is a Croatian professional basketball player, currently playing for Adria Oil Škrljevo in the Croatian League.

Professional career
On June 30, 2014, he signed a three-year deal with the Croatian team Cedevita. On July 25, 2016, he left Cedevita.

On August 28, 2016, he signed with Italian club Pallacanestro Cantù for the 2016–17 season.

In August 2017, he signed with Selçuklu Belediyesi of the Turkish Basketball Second League.

In August 2018, he signed with the Lithuanian Lietkabelis.

In December 2018, he signed with the Croatian Cibona.

In December 2020, after a year and a half long break during which he was dealing with a back problem, Pilepić signed for Adria Oil Škrljevo of the Croatian League.

Euroleague career statistics

|-
| style="text-align:left;"| 2014–15
| style="text-align:left;" rowspan=2| Cedevita
| 10 || 10 || 23.4 || .516 || .532 || 1.000 || 1.4 || 1.5 || .6 || .0 || 11.7 || 9.3
|-
| style="text-align:left;"| 2015–16
| 22 || 1 || 17.6 || .529 || .484 || 1.000 || 1.3 || .9 || .4 || .1 || 6.4 || 4.8
|- class="sortbottom"
| style="text-align:left;"| Career
| style="text-align:left;"|
| 32 || 11 || 19.4 || .523 || .505 || 1.000 || 1.3 || 1.1 || .4 || .0 || 8.1|| 6.2

References

External links
 Fran Pilepić at aba-liga.com
 Fran Pilepić at euroleague.net

1989 births
Living people
ABA League players
BC Lietkabelis players
Bilbao Basket players
Croatian expatriate basketball people in Spain
Croatian expatriate basketball people in Turkey
Croatian men's basketball players
HKK Široki players
KK Cedevita players
KK Cibona players
Lega Basket Serie A players
Liga ACB players
Pallacanestro Cantù players
Shooting guards
KK Kvarner players
KK Škrljevo players